Nebria hikosana is a species of brown coloured ground beetle in the  Nebriinae subfamily that is endemic to Mount Hiko, Kyushu, Japan.

References

hikosana
Beetles described in 1956
Beetles of Asia
Endemic fauna of Japan